The foreign relations of the Sahrawi Arab Democratic Republic (SADR) are conducted by the Polisario Front, which maintains a network of representation offices and embassies in foreign countries.

The Sahrawi Arab Democratic Republic (SADR) is the government in exile claiming sovereignty of the former Spanish colony of Western Sahara. The Polisario Front, the national liberation movement that administers the SADR, currently controls the area that it calls the Liberated Territories, a strip of Western Sahara territory east of the Moroccan Wall. It also administers the Sahrawi refugee camps at Tindouf, Algeria, where its headquarters are. It has conducted diplomatic relations with states and international organisations since its inception in 1973. In 1966, United Nations General Assembly Resolution 22/29 affirmed for the first time the Sahrawi right on self-determination. In 1979, United Nations General Assembly Resolution 34/37 reaffirmed again the right of the Western Sahara people to self-determination and independence, recognising also the Polisario Front as the representative of the Western Sahara people.

Since the country is not widely recognised, the government has asked Independent Diplomat to serve its interests.

Recognition
. Of these,  have "frozen" or "withdrawn" recognition for a number of reasons. Several states that do not recognise the Sahrawi Republic nonetheless recognize the Polisario Front as the legitimate representative of the population of the Western Sahara, but not as the government-in-exile for a sovereign state. 
The republic has been a full member of the African Union (AU), formerly the Organization of African Unity (OAU), since 1984.  Morocco withdrew from the OAU in protest and remained the only African nation not within the AU between South Africa's admittance in 1994 and (re-)joining the African Union in 2017. The SADR also participates as guest on meetings of the Non-Aligned Movement or the New Asian–African Strategic Partnership, over Moroccan objections to SADR participation. On the other hand, upholding Moroccan "territorial integrity" is favoured by the Arab League.

Besides Algeria, Mexico,  Iran, Venezuela, Vietnam, Nigeria, and South Africa, India was the major middle power to have ever recognised SADR and maintained full diplomatic relations, having allowed the Sahrawi Arab Democratic Republic to open an embassy in New Delhi in 1985. However, India "withdrew" its recognition in 2000.

As with any fluid political situation, diplomatic recognitions of either party's rights are subject to frequent and sometimes unannounced change.

Bilateral relations 

The Sahrawi Arab Democratic Republic has, since its proclamation established diplomatic relations with a number of states, mainly in Africa and Latin America, which have recognised its independence. In connection with the "freezing", "withdrawing" and resuming of recognition, similar changes have occurred at the level of diplomatic relations. SADR has stable and developed relationships with states such as Algeria and South Africa.

The Sahrawi Arab Democratic Republic is represented abroad by the Polisario Front, which maintains a network of missions and embassies. Some states that have recognised the Sahrawi Arab Democratic Republic have elevated the Polisario representation in their country to the status of SADR embassy. The Polisario Front maintains also a network of representations on countries that do not recognized the SADR as a sovereign country, mainly in Europe, with some of them having relations with the host country governments. Representation of foreign countries to the SADR is performed by embassies located abroad, mainly in Algiers, due to the Western Sahara conflict and the settlement of the Sahrawi refugee camps in south-western Algeria. Strong support of Sahrawi cause from some countries is demonstrated by foreign delegation's visits in Liberated Territories of Western Sahara.

Current diplomatic relations 

A total of 36 states presently maintain diplomatic relations with the SADR. Of these, 28 have continuously maintained relations with SADR without any interruptions. As of 6 August 2018, Botswana is the most recent nation to have formally established diplomatic relations with the Sahrawi Arab Democratic Republic. Eight states have frozen or canceled relations with the SADR in the past, but later resumed them. As of 20 September 2022, South Sudan is the most recent nation that reestablished diplomatic relations with SADR.

Former diplomatic relations 

A total of 16 states or more  maintained official diplomatic relations with the SADR in the past. Their relations with SADR are now suspended, frozen or cancelled. As of 12 March 2020, Liberia is the most recent nation to formally cancel diplomatic relations with the Sahrawi Arab Democratic Republic.

Relations with international organisations 
The Sahrawi Arab Democratic Republic holds either 'member' or 'observer' status in several international organisations. It participates in the activities of organisations that have formalised its membership, as well as in activities of other organizations as a guest participant. The SADR is usually represented by a Government or national organisations such as the Sahrawi Trade Union.

International treaties and conventions 
The Sahrawi Arab Democratic Republic  has signed a number of international treaties, conventions, protocols and charters negotiated in the context of the African Union. SADR participates in protection of human rights, common defense or  trade liberalisation by signature of following agreements.

Participation in international sports federations 
In 2015, the Sahrawi Arab Democratic Republic participated for the first time in the All Africa Games, the biggest African multi-sports event.

See also
 International recognition of the Sahrawi Arab Democratic Republic
 List of diplomatic missions to the Sahrawi Arab Democratic Republic
 List of diplomatic missions of the Sahrawi Arab Democratic Republic
 Political status of Western Sahara

Notes

References

External links
 Sahara Press Service - public service of the Sahrawi Arab Democratic Republic